The Steamboat House is an historic house at 601 North Front Street in Dardanelle, Arkansas.  A two-story wood-frame structure, it has cross-gabled roof and weatherboard siding.  It is trimmed in the Carpenter Gothic style, with an open single-story porch that has turned posts and a spindled  frieze.  On the second floor there are doors leading to small balconies with similar decoration.  The house was built about 1890, and is a local example of the Steamboat gothic style.

The house was listed on the National Register of Historic Places in 1975.

See also
National Register of Historic Places listings in Yell County, Arkansas

References

Houses on the National Register of Historic Places in Arkansas
National Register of Historic Places in Yell County, Arkansas
Gothic Revival architecture in Arkansas
Houses completed in 1890
Houses in Yell County, Arkansas
1890 establishments in Arkansas
Dardanelle, Arkansas